The Bornus Consort is a Polish male vocal sextet for early music founded in 1981, and led by musicologist . It was one of the first generation of early music groups in Poland.

Discography
Bartlomiej Pekiel: Audite Mortales; 3 Motets; Missa Brevis	Accord (French record label) 1989		
Mikolaj Zielenski: Offertoria et Communiones Totius Anni 1996
Media Vita: Polish Passion Songs Dux Records  1997 		
Marcin Mielczewski Dux Records

References

Early music groups